Uronema may refer to:
 Uronema (ciliate) (Uronema Dujardin, 1841)
 Uronema (green alga) (Uronema Lagerheim, 1887)